The 2003 NCAA Division II Men's Soccer Championship was the 32nd annual tournament held by the NCAA to determine the top men's Division II college soccer program in the United States.

On the strength of Leon Jackson's late 2nd half goal Lynn (20-0-1) defeated Chico State in the tournament final, 2–1. The final and semi-finals were played at the Virginia Beach Sportsplex in Virginia Beach, Virginia

This was the first national title for the Fighting Knights, who were coached by Shaun Pendleton, and had previously been finalists in 1997.

Bracket

Final

See also  
 NCAA Division I Men's Soccer Championship
 NCAA Division III Men's Soccer Championship
 NAIA Men's Soccer Championship

References 

NCAA Division II Men's Soccer Championship
NCAA Division II Men's Soccer Championship
NCAA Division II Men's Soccer Championship
NCAA Division II Men's Soccer Championship
Lynn Fighting Knights men's soccer